This is a list of standards published by Ecma International, formerly the European Computer Manufacturers Association.

ECMA-1 – ECMA-99

ECMA-100 – ECMA-199

 ECMA-114 – 8-Bit coded character set, Latin/Arabic (same as ISO/IEC 8859-6)
 ECMA-118 – 8-Bit coded character set, Latin/Greek (same as ISO/IEC 8859-7)
 ECMA-119 – CD-ROM file system (later adopted as ISO 9660:1988)
 ECMA-120 – Data Interchange on 12,7 mm 18-Track Magnetic Tape Cartridges (ISO 9661)
 ECMA-121 – 8-Bit coded character set, Latin/Hebrew (same as ISO/IEC 8859-8)
 ECMA-125 – 3½-inch floppy disk (also ISO/IEC 9529)
 ECMA-128 – 8-Bit coded character set, Latin Alphabet No 5 (same as ISO/IEC 8859-9)
 ECMA-130 – CD-ROM "Yellow Book" format (same as ISO/IEC 10149)
 ECMA-133 – Private Integrated Services Network (PISN) – Reference Configuration for PISN Exchanges (PINX) (ISO/IEC 11579-1/ETSI ETS 300 475-1)
 ECMA-139 – 4 mm Digital Data Storage (DDS) cartridges (same as ISO/IEC 10777)
 ECMA-142 – Private Integrated Services Network (PISN) - Circuit Mode 64kbit/s Bearer Services - Service Description, Functional Capabilities and Information Flows (BCSD) (ISO/IEC 11574/ETSI EN 300 171)
 ECMA-143 – Private Integrated Services Network (PISN) - Circuit Mode Bearer Services - Inter-Exchange Signalling Procedures and Protocol (QSIG-BC) (ISO/IEC 11572/ETSI EN 300 172)
 ECMA-144 – 8-Bit coded character set (same as ISO/IEC 8859-10) (3rd edition Dec 2000)
 ECMA-145 – 8 mm Wide Magnetic Tape Cartridge for Information Interchange – Helical Scan Recording (ISO/IEC 11319)
 ECMA-146 – 4 mm DAT data cartridges (same as ISO/IEC 11321)
 ECMA-147 – Data Interchange on 90 mm Flexible Disk Cartridges using MFM Recording at 31 831 ftprad on 80 Tracks on Each Side – ISO Type 303 (ISO/IEC 10994)
 ECMA-148 – Private Integrated Services Network (PISN) - Specification, Functional Model and Information Flows – Identification Supplementary Services (ISSD) (ISO/IEC 14136/ETSI ETS 300 173)
 ECMA-149 – Portable Common Tool Environment (PCTE) - Abstract Specification (ISO/IEC 13719-1)
 ECMA-150 – 3,81 mm Wide Magnetic Tape Cartridge for Information Interchange - Helical Scan Recording – DDS-DC Format using 60 m and 90 m Length Tapes (ISO/IEC 11557)
 ECMA-151 – Data Compression for Information Interchange - Adaptive Coding with Embedded Dictionary – DCLZ Algorithm (ISO/IEC 11558)
 ECMA-152 – Data Interchange on 12,7 mm 18-Track Magnetic Tape Cartridges - Extended Format (ISO/IEC 11559)
 ECMA-153 – Information Interchange on 130 mm Optical Disk Cartridges of the Write Once, Read Multiple (WORM) Type, using the Magneto-Optical Effect (ISO/IEC 11560)
 ECMA-154 – Data Interchange on 90 mm Optical Disk Cartridges, Read only and Rewritable, M.O. (ISO/IEC 10090)
 ECMA-155 – Private Integrated Services Networks – Addressing (ISO/IEC 11571/ETSI EN 300 189)
 ECMA-156 – Private Telecommunication Networks (PTN) – Signalling at the S Reference Point – Generic Keypad Protocol for the Support of Supplementary Services (SSIG-KP) (ETSI ETS 300 190)
 ECMA-157 – Private Telecommunication Networks (PTN) – Signalling Protocol at the S Reference Point – Identification Supplementary Services (SSIG-ID) (ETSI ETS 300 191)
 ECMA-158 – Portable Common Tool Environment (PCTE) – C Programming Language Binding (ISO/IEC 13719-2)
 ECMA-159 – Data Compression for Information Interchange – Binary Arithmetic Coding Algorithm (ISO/IEC 12042)
 ECMA-160 – Determination of Sound Power Levels of Computer and Business Equipment using Sound Intensity Measurements; Scanning Method in Controlled Rooms (ISO 9614-2)
 ECMA-161 – Private Telecommunication Networks (PTN) – Signalling at the S Reference Point – Generic Feature Key Management Protocol for the Control of Supplementary Services (SSIG-FK) (ETSI ETS 300 240)
 ECMA-162 – Portable Common Tool Environment (PCTE) – Ada Programming Language Binding (ISO/IEC 13719-3)
 ECMA-163 – Private Integrated Services Network (PISN) – Specification, Functional Model and Information Flows – Name Identification Supplementary Services (NISD) (ISO/IEC 13864/ETSI ETS 300 237)
 ECMA-164 – Private Integrated Services Network (PISN) – Inter-Exchange Signalling Protocol – Name Identification Supplementary Services (QSIG-NA) (ISO/IEC 13868/ETSI ETS 300 238)
 ECMA-165 – Private Integrated Services Network (PISN) – Generic Functional Protocol for the Support of Supplementary Services – Inter-Exchange Signalling Procedures and Protocol (QSIG-GF) (ISO/IEC 11582/ETSI ETS 300 239)
 ECMA-167 – Universal Disk Format (same as ISO/IEC 13346)
 ECMA-168 – ISO 9660 Level 3 (ISO/IEC 13490)
 ECMA-169 – 8 mm Wide Magnetic Tape Cartridge Dual Azimuth Format for Information Interchange – Helical Scan Recording (ISO/IEC 12246)
 ECMA-170 – 3,81 mm Wide Magnetic Tape Cartridge for Information Interchange – Helical Scan Recording – DDS Format Using 60 m and 90 m Length Tapes (ISO/IEC 12247)
 ECMA-171 – 3,81 mm Wide Magnetic Tape Cartridge for Information Interchange – Helical Scan Recording – DATA/DAT-DC Format Using 60 m and 90 m Length Tapes (ISO/IEC 12248)
 ECMA-173 – Private Integrated Services Network (PISN) – Specification, Functional Model and Information Flows – Call Diversion Supplementary Services (CFSD) (ISO/IEC 13872/ETSI ETS 300 256)
 ECMA-174 – Private Integrated Services Network (PISN) – Inter-Exchange Signalling Protocol – Call Diversion Supplementary Services (QSIG-CF) (ISO/IEC 13873/ETSI ETS 300 257)
 ECMA-175 – Private Integrated Services Network (PISN) – Specification, Functional Model and Information Flows – Path Replacement Additional Network Feature (ANF-PRSD) (ISO/IEC 13863/ETSI ETS 300 258)
 ECMA-176 – Private Integrated Services Network (PISN) – Inter-Exchange Signalling Protocol – Path Replacement Additional Network Feature (QSIG-PR) (ISO/IEC 13874/ETSI ETS 300 259)
 ECMA-177 – Private Integrated Services Network (PISN) – Specification, Functional Model and Information Flows – Call Transfer Supplementary Service (CTSD) (ISO/IEC 13865/ETSI ETS 300 260)
 ECMA-178 – Private Integrated Services Network (PISN) – Inter-Exchange Signalling Protocol – Call Transfer Supplementary Service (QSIG-CT) (ISO/IEC 13869/ETSI ETS 300 261)
 ECMA-179 – Services for Computer Supported Telecommunications Applications (CSTA) Phase I
 ECMA-180 – Protocol for Computer Supported Telecommunications Applications (CSTA) Phase I
 ECMA-182 – Cyclic redundancy check polynomial CRC-64-ECMA-182 (ISO/IEC 13421)
 ECMA-183 – Data Interchange on 130 mm Optical Disk Cartridges – Capacity: 1 Gigabyte per Cartridge (ISO/IEC 13481)
 ECMA-184 – Data Interchange on 130 mm Optical Disk Cartridges – Capacity: 1,3 Gigabytes per Cartridge (ISO/IEC 13549)
 ECMA-185 – Private Integrated Services Network (PISN) – Specification, Functional Model and Information Flows – Call Completion Supplementary Services (CCSD) (ISO/IEC 13866/ETSI ETS 300 365)
 ECMA-186 – Private Integrated Services Network (PISN) – Inter-Exchange Signalling Protocol – Call Completion Supplementary Services (QSIG-CC) (ISO/IEC 13870/ETSI ETS 300 366)
 ECMA-189 – Information Interchange on 300 mm Optical Disk Cartridges of the Write Once, Read Multiple (WORM) Type using the SSF Method (ISO/IEC 13614)
 ECMA-190 – Information Interchange on 300 mm Optical Disk Cartridges of the Write Once, Read Multiple (WORM) Type using the CCS Method (ISO/IEC 13403)
 ECMA-191 – Private Integrated Services Network (PISN) – Specification, Functional Model and Information Flows – Call Offer Supplementary Service (COSD) (ISO/IEC 14841/ETSI EN 300 361)
 ECMA-192 – Private Integrated Services Network (PISN) – Inter-Exchange Signalling Protocol – Call Offer Supplementary Service (QSIG-CO) (ISO/IEC 14843/ETSI EN 300 362)
 ECMA-193 – Private Integrated Services Network (PISN) – Specification, Functional Model and Information Flows – Do Not Disturb and Do Not Disturb Override Supplementary Services (DND(O)SD) (ISO/IEC 14842/ETSI EN 300 363)
 ECMA-194 – Private Integrated Services Network (PISN) – Inter-Exchange Signalling Protocol – Do Not Disturb and Do Not Disturb Override Supplementary Services (QSIG-DND(O)) (ISO/IEC 14844/ETSI EN 300 364)
 ECMA-195 – Data Interchange on 130 mm Optical Disk Cartridges – Capacity: 2 Gigabytes per Cartridge (ISO/IEC 13842)
 ECMA-196 – Data Interchange on 12,7 mm 36-Track Magnetic Tape Cartridges (ISO/IEC 14251)
 ECMA-197 – Data Interchange on 12,7 mm 112-Track Magnetic Tape Cartridges – DLT2 Format (ISO/IEC 13962)
 ECMA-198 – 3,81 mm Wide Magnetic Tape Cartridge for Information Interchange – Helical Scan Recording – DDS-2 Format using 120 m Length Tapes (ISO/IEC 13923)

ECMA-200 – ECMA-299
 ECMA-205 – Commercially Oriented Functionality Class for Security Evaluation (COFC) 
 ECMA-206 – Association Context Management including Security Context Management
 ECMA-208 – System-Independent Data Format - SIDF (same as ISO/IEC 14863)
 ECMA-209
 ECMA-219 – Authentication and Privilege Attribute Security Application with related Key Distribution Functions - Part 1, 2 and 3
 ECMA-231
 ECMA-234 – Application Programming Interface for Windows
 ECMA-235 – The Ecma GSS-API Mechanism
 ECMA-246 – Specification of AIT-1
 ECMA-258
 ECMA-259
 ECMA-262 – ECMAScript (ISO/IEC 16262) (standardised JavaScript)
 ECMA-286
 ECMA-291 – Specification of AIT-1 with MIC Format
 ECMA-292 – Specification of AIT-2 with MIC Format

ECMA-300 – ECMA-399
 ECMA-307 – Corporate Telecommunication Networks - Signalling Interworking between QSIG and H.323 - Generic Functional Protocol for the Support of Supplementary Services 
 ECMA-308 – Corporate Telecommunication Networks - Signalling Interworking between QSIG and H.323 - Call Transfer Supplementary Services
 ECMA-309 – Corporate Telecommunication Networks - Signalling Interworking between QSIG and H.323 - Call Diversion Supplementary Services 
 ECMA-316 – VXA
 ECMA-319 – Ultrium-1
 ECMA-320 – Super DLT
 ECMA-326 – Corporate Telecommunication Networks - Signalling Interworking between QSIG and H.323 - Call Completion Supplementary Services
 ECMA-329 – Specification of AIT-3
 ECMA-332 – Corporate Telecommunication Networks - Signalling Interworking between QSIG and H.323 - Basic Services
 ECMA-334 – C# programming language (ISO/IEC 23270)
 ECMA-335 – Common Language Infrastructure (ISO/IEC 23271)
 ECMA-355 – Corporate Telecommunication Networks - Tunnelling of QSIG over SIP
 ECMA-357 – ECMAScript for XML (E4X) (withdrawn)
 ECMA-360 – Corporate telecommunication networks - Signalling interworking between QSIG and SIP - Call diversion
 ECMA-361 – Corporate telecommunication networks - Signalling interworking between QSIG and SIP - Call transfer 
 ECMA-363 – Universal 3D file format
 ECMA-365 – Universal Media Disc (UMD)
 ECMA-367 – Eiffel: Analysis, Design and Programming Language
 ECMA-368 – Ultra-wideband physical and MAC layers
 ECMA-369 – Ultra-wideband MAC-PHY interface
 ECMA-370 – TED - The Eco Declaration
 ECMA-372 – C++/CLI
 ECMA-376 – Office Open XML
 ECMA-377 – Holographic Versatile Disc 200GB recordable cartridge
 ECMA-378 – Holographic Versatile Disc 100GB HVD-ROM
 ECMA-379 – Test Method for the Estimation of the Archival Lifetetime of Optical Media
 ECMA-380 – Ultra Density Optical (UDO)
 ECMA-381 – Procedure for the Registration of Assigned Numbers for ECMA-368 and ECMA-369
 ECMA-388 – Open XML Paper Specification

ECMA-400 – ECMA-499
 ECMA-402 – ECMAScript Internationalization API Specification
 ECMA-404 – The JSON Data Interchange Format
 ECMA-407 – Scalable Sparse Spatial Sound System (S5) – Base S5 Coding
 ECMA-408 – Dart Programming Language Specification

See also
 List of ISO standards

External links
 List of Ecma standards (Ecma International)
 Index of Ecma Standards (Ecma International)
 List of Ecma withdrawn Standards (Ecma International)

Ecma standards